Melanopsis praemorsa is a species of freshwater snail in the family Melanopsidae.

References

External links

Melanopsidae
Gastropods described in 1758
Taxa named by Carl Linnaeus